Greenville is a unincorporated community in Plumas County, California, United States, on the north-west side of Indian Valley. Most of the buildings were destroyed by the Dixie Fire in August 2021. The population was 1,129 at the 2010 census, down from 1,160 at the 2000 census. For statistical purposes, the United States Census Bureau has defined Greenville as a census-designated place (CDP).

History
The Maidu people had been living in the valley area around present-day Greenville for centuries when English-speaking settlers arrived in the 1850s during the Gold Rush. Among the earliest structures built in the community was a boarding house operated by Mr. and Mrs. Green. The community was named for Green, who was killed in the collapse of the first Round Valley Dam. When Henry C. Bidwell arrived in 1862 and opened a trading post, several business owners moved down from Round Valley to Greenville.

Cheney Lumber Company built a wood mill near Greenville.

1881 fire
A fire destroyed many buildings in 1881; they were quickly rebuilt. Greenville's population in 1882 was 500.

2021 fire
On August 4, 2021, about 75% of Greenville's buildings were destroyed by the Dixie Fire, the largest single (i.e. non-complex) wildfire in the state's history, and the second-largest overall (after the August Complex fire of 2020). Fire officials stated that the library, fire department, and most downtown homes were burned. The Los Angeles Times estimated that about $1 billion, through government aid, insurance payouts, lawsuits against Pacific Gas & Electric, corporate investment and philanthropic donations, has been promised, paid or will be forced to pay for the damage and rebuilding of Greenville.

Climate
According to the Köppen Climate Classification system, Greenville has a warm-summer Mediterranean climate, abbreviated "Csb" on climate maps. Its winter temperatures approach that of a continental climate, and diurnal temperature variation is large, especially during summer.

Demographics
For statistical purposes, the United States Census Bureau has defined Greenville as a census-designated place (CDP).

2010
At the 2010 census Greenville had a population of 1,129. The racial makeup of Greenville was 897 (79.5%) White, Hispanic or Latino of any race were 109 people (9.7%), 1 (0.1%) African American, 133 (11.8%) Native American, 11 (1.0%) Asian, 0 (0.0%) Pacific Islander, 17 (1.5%) from other races, and 70 (6.2%) from two or more races.

The whole population lived in households, no one lived in non-institutionalized group quarters and no one was institutionalized.

There were 496 households, 139 (28.0%) had children under the age of 18 living in them, 181 (36.5%) were opposite-sex married couples living together, 77 (15.5%) had a female householder with no husband present, 25 (5.0%) had a male householder with no wife present.  There were 52 (10.5%) unmarried opposite-sex partnerships, and 3 (0.6%) same-sex married couples or partnerships. 171 households (34.5%) were one person and 67 (13.5%) had someone living alone who was 65 or older. The average household size was 2.28.  There were 283 families (57.1% of households); the average family size was 2.91.

The age distribution was 256 people (22.7%) under the age of 18, 78 people (6.9%) aged 18 to 24, 227 people (20.1%) aged 25 to 44, 378 people (33.5%) aged 45 to 64, and 190 people (16.8%) who were 65 or older.  The median age was 45.4 years. For every 100 females, there were 97.4 males.  For every 100 females age 18 and over, there were 95.3 males.

There were 613 housing units at an average density of 76.7 per square mile, of the occupied units 251 (50.6%) were owner-occupied and 245 (49.4%) were rented. The homeowner vacancy rate was 4.9%; the rental vacancy rate was 9.2%.  583 people (51.6% of the population) lived in owner-occupied housing units and 546 people (48.4%) lived in rental housing units.

2000
At the 2000 census there were 1,160 people, 496 households, and 308 families in the CDP. The racial makeup of the CDP was 84.05% White, 9.31% of the population were Hispanic or Latino of any race, 0.09% Black or African American, 9.31% Native American, 0.26% Asian, 2.84% from other races, and 3.45% from two or more races.
Of the 496 households 27.4% had children under the age of 18 living with them, 45.0% were married couples living together, 11.5% had a female householder with no husband present, and 37.9% were non-families. 33.1% of households were one person and 12.5% were one person aged 65 or older.  The average household size was 2.30 and the average family size was 2.90.

The age distribution was 24.6% under the age of 18, 7.2% from 18 to 24, 25.0% from 25 to 44, 24.1% from 45 to 64, and 19.2% 65 or older.  The median age was 41 years. For every 100 females, there were 92.1 males.  For every 100 females age 18 and over, there were 91.5 males.

The median household income was $23,309 and the median family income  was $26,354. Males had a median income of $27,143 versus $24,000 for females. The per capita income for the CDP was $11,659.  About 13.9% of families and 21.0% of the population were below the poverty line, including 20.2% of those under age 18 and 10.2% of those age 65 or over.

Education
Greenville's students attend the Indian Valley Elementary and Greenville Junior/Senior High Schools.  The schools come under the authority of the Plumas County Board of Education and the Plumas Unified School District.  The school's mascots are the 'Wolf Pack' for the elementary school and the 'Indians' for the Junior/Senior High School.

Politics

Transportation
 State Route 89

Notable people
 James Marsters (born 1962), actor and musician
 Marie Mason Potts (1895–1978), Mountain Maidu journalist and activist; attended Greenville Indian School for a few years.
 Bill Wattenburg (1936–2018), inventor, author, and radio talk show host

See also
 Greenville Rancheria of Maidu Indians, headquartered in Greenville

References

External links

 Indian Valley Record - Local newspaper
 Dixie fire photo gallery - Los Angeles Times
 Before and after imagery shows Greenville largely reduced to ash - CNN

Census-designated places in Plumas County, California
Census-designated places in California